Al-Rai (al-Ra'i or al-Rayi),  is a small town in northern Aleppo Governorate, northern Syria. With 4,609 inhabitants, as per the 2004 census, al-Rai is the administrative center of the sparsely populated Nahiya al-Rai. Located at the Baghdad Railway and close to the Turkish border, right across Elbeyli, it is however a strategically important village.

Prior to the Syrian Civil War, the town was inhabited primarily by Turkmen.

Railway 
The Al-Rai Railway Border Gate which had been closed since 1981, was reopened on 22 December 2009 after the 62 km line between Aleppo and Al-Rai was renewed. The opening ceremony was attended by the transport ministers of Turkey and Syria, Binali Yıldırım and Yaarub Bader.

Education

Education under Turkish occupation (2016–present) 
On 3 February 2021, a shoemaking and tailoring workshop for prisoners was established in collaboration between Turkish-Dutch NGO Sumud and Turkey's Ministry of Youth and Sports.

On 6 February 2021, Official Gazette of Turkey announced Turkey's plan to open a new health care vocational school and a medical faculty in Al-Rai. Syrian Foreign Ministry expressed their objection through Syria's official news agency SANA, and named the decision "a dangerous act and a flagrant violation of international law".

Syrian Civil War
In the Syrian Civil War, al-Rai was captured by Free Syrian Army (FSA) forces and held until early February 2014, when the FSA-allies the Al-Tawhid Brigade and Conquest Brigade were assaulted by a predominantly Chechen unit of the Islamic State of Iraq and the Levant, (ISIL) who seized the town on 3 February 2014.

Since then, ISIL considered the town its main stronghold in the Aleppo countryside. In the course of their Northern Aleppo offensive, FSA units captured the town twice in April 2016 and in June 2016, but both times were not able to withstand counterattacks by ISIL. The FSA recaptured the town a third time in the August 2016 Battle of al-Rai, but lost it yet another time to an ISIL counterattack later in August. On 3 September 2016, rebels were reported to have recaptured the town for the fourth time with the help of Turkish forces (including tanks) and to have seized several villages close by.

Syrian Turkmen Brigades' political wing Syrian Turkmen Assembly announced the relocation of its headquarters into Al-Rai on 31 December 2019, which was previously located in Istanbul, Turkey.

Gallery

See also 
 Talal Silo, Syrian Democratic Forces commander originating from Al-Rai

References

Turkmen communities in Syria
Populated places in al-Bab District